Rachel David (born 4 January 1996) is an Indian actress, who works in Malayalam film industry and Kannada film industry. She is known for her role in Love Mocktail 2.
 She debuted in the 2019 Malayalam film Irupathiyonnaam Noottaandu alongside Pranav Mohanlal.

Personal life 
Rachel was born on 4 January 1996 at Bangalore, Karnataka.  She did her schooling at Bishop Cotton Girls school, Bangalore. She also completed her pre-university at Christ college and went onto pursue her graduation in Bachelors of Business Management at St. Joseph’s College of Commerce. She is settled in Bengaluru.

Career 
She started her career in film Industry in 2019 with the film Irupathiyonnaam Noottaandu as Zaya, the heroine of the film opposite to Pranav Mohanlal. In the same year, she appeared in the film Oronnonnara Pranayakadha in lead role. Rachel David made her Kannada film debut with Krishna’s Love Mocktail 2 in 2021. Although she known as Zaya David, her official and stage name is Rachel David. She made her debut in Kannada with the film Love Mocktail which was released in February 2022.

Filmography

References

External links 

Living people
1996 births
21st-century Indian actresses
Actresses from Bangalore
Actresses in Malayalam cinema